The 2007 Gloucester City Council election took place on 3 May 2007 to elect members of Gloucester City Council in England. The council remained under no overall control. Prior to the election the leader of the council was Mark Hawthorne, a Conservative, but he chose not to stand for re-election. Paul James was appointed leader after the election, continuing to lead a Conservative minority administration.

Results  

|}

Ward results

Abbey

Barnwood

Barton and Tredworth

Hucclecote

Kingsholm and Wotton

Longlevens

Matson and Robinswood

Moreland

Quedgeley Fieldcourt

Quedgeley Severn Vale

Westgate

References

2007 English local elections
2007
2000s in Gloucestershire